The 2008 Canadian Figure Skating Championships took place from January 16 through 20th, 2008 at the Pacific National Exhibition in Vancouver, British Columbia. They were the figure skating competition which determine the national champions of Canada. The event was organized by Skate Canada, the nation's figure skating governing body. Skaters competed at the senior and junior levels in the disciplines of men's singles, women's singles, pair skating, and ice dancing. The results of this competition were used to pick the Canadian teams to the 2008 World Championships, the 2008 Four Continents Championships, and the 2008 World Junior Championships.

Senior results

Men

Women

Pairs

Ice dancing

Junior results

Men

Women

Pairs

Ice dancing

International team selections

World Championships

Four Continents Championships

World Junior Championships

External links
 Official site
 Skate Canada announces World, Junior World and Four Continents teams

Sport in Vancouver
Canadian Figure Skating Championships
Canadian Figure Skating Championships
2008 in Canadian sports
2008 in British Columbia